Mindrage was a Christian metal band from Little Rock, Arkansas, United States. The band was compared to Living Sacrifice and Soulfly in a review with another fellow Christian metal band Nailed Promise, who Mindrage did a split with. In 2002, the band broke-up. Vocalist John LeCompt went on to join Evanescence in 2003. Before forming Mindrage, Original drummer, Chad Wilburn formed Society's Finest. Second drummer Justin Carder, later joined Machina, a band that LeCompt was also in.

Members
Last known line-up
 John LeCompt – vocals, guitar (1997–2002)
 Nick Williams – bass (1997–2002)
 Justin Carder – drums (1999–2002)

Former members
 Chad Wilburn – drums (1997–1999)

Discography

Demo
 Mindrage Demo (1997)

Other songs
 "Haven of Blasphemy" by Living Sacrifice (cover version)

References

External links
Mindrage in the Encyclopedia of Contemporary Christian Music

American Christian metal musical groups
American musical trios
Musical groups established in 1997
Musical groups disestablished in 2002